Jacopo Zoboli (23 May 1681 – 1767) was an Italian painter of the late-Baroque period.

He was born at Modena about the year 1700. His first patron, Marquis Taddeo Rangone sent him to study first under Francesco Stringa, then to Bologna. He went to Rome, where he died about 1765. He painted an altarpiece for the church of Sant'Eustachio in Rome.  He painted altarpieces and portraits, and is said to have etched fifteen plates dealing with Life of Aloysius Gonzaga and Stanislaus Kostka. He also made colored etchings of Bracciano, Tivoli, Visa, and Brescia. He is said to have died poor in Rome.

References

Attribution:

1660s births
1760s deaths
Italian etchers
17th-century Italian painters
Italian male painters
18th-century Italian painters
Painters from Modena
18th-century Italian male artists